Anette Helene Delebekk (born 12 February 1992) is a former Norwegian handball player who last played for Fredrikstad BK.

She also represented Norway in the 2012 Women's Junior World Handball Championship, placing 8th.

Achievements 
World Youth Championship:
Silver Medalist: 2010

References

1992 births
Living people
Sportspeople from Fredrikstad
Norwegian female handball players
21st-century Norwegian women